CITV is a British free-to-air children's television block owned by ITV plc.

CITV may also refer to one of the following:
 CITV-DT, Global Television Network owned-and-operated station in Edmonton, Alberta
 CITV (Bermuda), local government-run channel in Bermuda
 CiTV (Estonia), former television channel in Estonia
 Commander's Independent Thermal Viewer, as on M1A2 and later variants of the M1 Abrams tank and many other modern tanks.  
 Co-operative Institute of Technology, Vatakara, Engineering college in Kerala, India